The following are the national records in Olympic weightlifting in Fiji. Records are maintained in each weight class for the snatch lift, clean and jerk lift, and the total for both lifts by the Fiji Weightlifting Association.

Current records

Men

Women

Historical records

Men (1998–2018)

Women (1998–2018)

References

External links
Fiji Weightlifting Association official website

Fiji
Olympic weightlifting
records
weightlifting